Musa Anter (1920 – 20 September 1992), also known as "Apê Musa" (literally "Uncle Musa"), was a Kurdish writer, journalist and intellectual and was assassinated by Turkish JITEM in September 1992.

Early life and education
He was born in the Eskimağara (Zivingê) village in the Mardin Province). Originally named Şeyhmus Elmas after Sheikh Şeyhmus, and Elmas (Diamond in Turkish) was the surname given by the Turkish authorities, he later wanted to be called Musa Anter. He was born into a respected family and after the death of his father, his mother became the Muhtar of the village who communicated with the tax collectors. His birth date is not known, first he was registered as born in 1924, then in 1920, but his mother shall have said that he was born after the judgement over the Christians for which Anter assumed to have been born either 1917 or 1918. He completed his primary education in Mardin, and then studied at junior and senior high school in Adana. During his high school studies, the Dersim rebellion lead by Seyid Riza was going on, which lead to some frictions with his Turkish classmates following which he was shortly detained. By 1941, he left for Istanbul to study Law. While studying, he was able to run a catering business for the mostly Kurdish students of the Dicle and Firat student halls. During his time at the university, he had often been to Syria during his summer holidays and got into acquaintance with Kurdish nationalist intellectuals such as Celadet and Kamuran Bedir Khan, Kadri and Ekrem Cemilpaşa, Dr. Nafiz, Nuri Zaza, Nuri Dersimi, Qedrîcan, Osman Sabri, Haco Agha and his son Hasan, Emînê Perîxanê's son Şikriye Emîn, Mala Elyê Unus, Teufo Ciziri and Cigerxwîn. Ayse was a member of a noble Kurdish family and had studied in a German school in Istanbul. At one moment, he even helped to organize an event for the German Ambassador to Turkey Franz von Papen. Following his military service in the Turkish army, he settled in Diyarbakir, where he became a manager of a Hotel nearby the NATO military base.

Professional career and Kurdish political activism 
He was actively promoting the use of the Kurdish language with his journalistic work, which caused him quite some turmoil during his lifetime. During the 1950s, he established three media outlets, the Şark Mecmuasi, (1951), the Şark Postasi (1954) and the Ilery Yurt (1958). After in 1959 he published the poem Qimil in Kurdish language in the newspaper Ilery Yurt, Anter was arrested. He eventually had to serve some time prison but was soon released due to an amnesty. In 1963 Musa Anter and other 23 intellectuals were arrested and were sentenced to 3 years for allegedly having attempted to establish an independent Kurdish state. He was released in 1964. In the General elections of 1965 he was an independent candidate for Diyarbakir but was not elected. In 1970 he was one of the charged in the trial of the Revolutionary Cultural Eastern Hearths (DDKO) members and after his release three years after he settled in Aksaru, a village in the Nusaybin district. Following the coup d'etat in 1980, he was shortly jailed for "Kurdish propaganda"  in Nusaybin. June 1990 he was one of the 81 founding members of the People's Labour Party (HEP). He later supported the establishments of the Mesopotamian Cultural Center in 1991 and Kurdish Institute in Istanbul in 1992.

Assassination 
Anter was shot on the 20 September 1992 in an incident in which Orhan Miroğlu was seriously injured.  Ümit Cizre claimed Abdülkadir Aygan, a former member of the Kurdistan Workers' Party (PKK) who had surrendered in 1985, and posteriorly recruited as part of the first staff of the JİTEM (the Turkish Gendarmerie's Intelligence and Counter-terrorism Service), said he had been part of a JİTEM unit and along with a "Hamit" from Şırnak, had assassinated Musa Anter. The former Major of the Turkish army Cem Ersever, claimed that the murder was facilitated by Alaattin Kanat, a former PKK member, who was shortly released during the time of the assassination. 

Özgür Politika and now-defunct Gülen movement newspaper, Zaman, claimed that the perpetrator was PKK defector Murat Ipek who received orders from the Turkish state's contract killer Mahmut Yıldırım (alias "Yeşil"), or Yeşil himself. After long investigations, Turkish Gendarmerie Intelligence and Counter-Terrorism was found guilty of Anter's assassination by the  European Court of Human Rights (ECHR) in 2006  which sentenced Turkey to a fine of 28,500 Euros. A Diyarbakır court in 2013 allegedly charged four individuals with Anter's murder, including Mahmut Yıldırım (alias "Yeşil") and Abdülkadir Aygan.

Legacy 
He is viewed as an important and influential Kurdish poet and author. He wrote for numerous publications such as Ileri Yurt, Deng, Yön, Özgür Gündem, Dicle-Firat amongst others and was also the author of Dictionary in Kurdish language. In 1997, the Turkish Human Rights Association (IHD) supported a peace initiative called the Musa Anter Peace Train.

Works 
Ferhenga Kurdî, (Kurdish Dictionary)1967

Personal life 
Musa Anter and Ayşe Hanım married in 1944. His wife was a descendant of Bedir Khan Beg and related to the AKP politician Cuneyd Zapsu. He was the father of three children.

References

External links
ECtHR judgment
Ahmet Alış, "Üç Devrin" Tanığı: Modern Kürt Siyasi Tarihinin İçinden Musa Anter'i Okumak, Birikim, September 20, 2010. 

1920 births
Assassinated Kurdish journalists
Assassinated Turkish journalists
People from Nusaybin
Istanbul University alumni
Istanbul University Faculty of Law alumni
Kurdish writers
Turkish Kurdish people
Article 2 of the European Convention on Human Rights
European Court of Human Rights cases involving Turkey
1992 deaths
Turkish writers